The women's golf tournament at the 2016 Summer Olympics placed at the Olympic Golf Course, built within the Reserva de Marapendi in the Barra da Tijuca zone, between 17 and 20 August 2016. It was the first women's golf tournament at the Olympics since 1900.

Sixty players played four rounds of stroke play. The field included 57 professionals and three amateurs.

The event was won by Inbee Park of South Korea with a score −16, defeating Lydia Ko from New Zealand and China's Shanshan Feng who won silver and bronze respectively.

The medals were presented by Dick Pound, IOC member, Canada and Antony Scanlon, Secretary General of the IGF.

Background
The first Olympic golf tournaments took place at the second modern Games in Paris 1900. Men's and women's events were held. Golf was featured again at the next Games, St. Louis 1904 with men's events (an individual tournament as well as a team event). The 1908 Games in London were also supposed to have a men's golf competition, but a dispute led to a boycott by all of the host nation's golfers, leaving only a single international competitor and resulting in the cancellation of the event. Golf would disappear from the Olympic programme from then until returning with this event.

While many of the top male players withdrew over concerns about Zika fever, few women did. The field included the top 9 ranked golfers, led by #1-ranked Lydia Ko of New Zealand.

32 of the 34 participating nations were making their debut. The United States and France were the only two nations to have competed at the only previous edition of the event, in 1900; both made their second appearance in 2016.

Qualification

Countries were permitted to qualify up to four athletes based on the world rankings. South Korea was the only nation to qualify all four athletes. The top 60 golfers, subject to limits per nation and guarantees for the host and continental representation, were selected. A nation could have three or four golfers if they were all in the top 15 of the rankings; otherwise, each nation was limited to two golfers. One spot was guaranteed for the host nation and five spots were guaranteed to ensure that each Olympic continent had at least one representative. Neither the host nor the continental guarantees turned out to be necessary, with Brazil qualifying 2 golfers and each continent having at least 3 golfers qualified.

Competition format

The tournament was a four-round stroke play tournament, with the lowest score over the total 72 holes winning.

Schedule

All times are Brasília Time (UTC-03:00)

Results

First round
Wednesday, 17 August 2016

Ariya Jutanugarn of Thailand shot a 6-under-par 65 to lead by one stroke over South Koreans Kim Sei-young and Inbee Park.

Second round
Thursday, 18 August 2016

Inbee Park of South Korea shot a second straight round of 66 to take the lead at 10-under-par, 132. Stacy Lewis of the United States shot the low round of the day, an 8-under-par 63, to climb to second place, one stroke behind Park. First round leader Ariya Jutanugarn of Thailand shot an even-par 71 to drop to a tie for 8th.

Third round
Friday, 19 August 2016

Inbee Park of South Korea maintained her lead by shooting a 1-under-par 70. Lydia Ko shot the low round of the day, a 6-under-par 65 to move into a tie for second place with American Gerina Piller. First round leader Ariya Jutanugarn withdrew after 13 holes with a knee injury.

Final round
Saturday, 20 August 2016

Inbee Park shot her third five-under-par 66 of the tournament to win the gold medal. Lydia Ko (silver) and Shanshan Feng (bronze) of China joined Park in the medals with final rounds of two-under-par 69.

References

Women
2016 in women's golf
Women's events at the 2016 Summer Olympics